Bhubanmohan Baruah (1914 - 1998) was a novelist, short story writer from Assam. He wrote many novels under the pen-name of Kanchan Baruah (কাঞ্চন বৰুৱা).

Life and works
Baruah served as a member of the Film Finance Board of Assam Government. He was also known  as a painter and artist. Moreover, he directed a number of plays.

He was a bachelor and had two brothers and two sisters.

The Government of Assam offered him literary pension.

He died in Shillong on 10 May 1998.

Literary works
Baruah was author of more than twenty other novels and some short stories. Some of the novels are: 
 Asimat Jar Heral Seema (অসীমত যাৰ হেৰাল সীমা) (1945)
 Puwoti tora (পূৱতি তৰা)
 Mrita bihanga (মৃত বিহংগ)
 Joya mohol (জয়া মহল)
 Ashanto prohor(অশান্ত প্ৰহৰ)
 Urmilar sokulu (উৰ্মিলাৰ চকুলো)

See also
 Assamese literature
 History of Assamese literature
 List of Asam Sahitya Sabha presidents
 List of Sahitya Akademi Award winners for Assamese
 List of Assamese-language poets
 List of Assamese writers with their pen names

References

External links
Kanchan barua ebook-অসীমত যাৰ হেৰাল সীমা -অসমীয়া ই-বুক- Assamese eBook

Novelists from Assam
1914 births
1972 deaths
20th-century Indian novelists
Assamese-language writers
20th-century Indian short story writers